The Price of Life may refer to:

 The Price of Life (1987 film), an American film
 The Price of Life (1994 film), a Croatian film
 Price of Life, a 2009 American documentary film